The Pakistan national cricket team toured the West Indies from April to May 2000 and played a three-match Test series against the West Indies cricket team which the West Indies won 1–0. Pakistan were captained by Moin Khan; West Indies by Jimmy Adams. In addition, the teams played in the 2000 Cable & Wireless ODI Series, a triangular Limited Overs International (LOI) tournament, along with Zimbabwe. Pakistan and West Indies reached the Finals, a three-match series which Pakistan won 2–1.

Test series summary

First Test

Second Test

Third Test

References

2000 in Pakistani cricket
2000 in West Indian cricket
Pakistani cricket tours of the West Indies
International cricket competitions from 1997–98 to 2000
West Indian cricket seasons from 1970–71 to 1999–2000